Giovanni Anselmo (born 1934 in Borgofranco d'Ivrea, Province of Turin, Italy) is an artist who emerged in Italy after World War II within the art movement called Arte Povera. His most famous artwork is Untitled (Sculpture That Eats) (1968), a piece of art representing time and nature.

Arte Povera movement
He participated in Arte Povera events starting in 1967, when he displayed his work in the context of the exhibition ConTempL'azione. This show was curated by Daniela Palazzoli in three galleries in Turin: Christian Stein, Sperone, and ll Punto.

Contemporary artists
Anselmo's work was shown alongside eleven other artists including Getulio Alviani, Alighiero Boetti, Luciano Fabro, Mario Merz, Aldo Mondino, Ugo Nespolo, Giuseppe Penone, Gianni Piacentino, Michelangelo Pistoletto, Paolo Scheggi, Gianni Emilio Simonetti and Gilberto Zorio.

Works
Anselmo's first solo exhibition was in 1968 at the Galleria Sperone in Milan. 
One of his works from 1971 is titled Invisible. Another from 1984 is titled senza titolo. Anselmo participated in the Venice Biennales of 1978, 1980 and 1990. He has held solo exhibitions around the world since debuting in Milan. His exhibitions have been held in the Renaissance Society, Chicago (1997), Palais des Beaux-Arts, Brussels (2002), Museum Kurhaus Kleve (2004), Stedelijk Museum, Gent (2005), and Kunstmuseum Winterthur (2013) and his work is present in the permanent collection at Collezione Maramotti since the 2007.

References

1934 births
Living people
Italian contemporary artists
Arte Povera
People from Borgofranco d'Ivrea